Jesper Lange (born 11 January 1986) is a Danish former professional football forward.

Career
Jesper Lange signed with Esbjerg fB in the summer 2006.

From 1. Juli he will play for AGF on a 3-year deal.

On 1 August 2018, Lange signed with Danish 2nd Division club Ringkøbing IF as a playing assistant coach. He left the club on 23 January 2019 by mutual termination.

He then signed with Middelfart G&BK on 29 January 2019. 33-year old Lange announced on 6 January 2020, that he would retire and that his body had said stop after three surgeries as a result of a cruciate ligament injury he suffered two and a half years ago.

Later career
After retiring from professional football, Lange returned to Esbjerg to play for Danish amateur club Sædding/Guldager IF in the Jutland Series in March 2020, where former professional Tommy Løvenkrands also was playing. Lange would also function as an individual coach for Sædding/Guldager IF and was also affiliated with Esbjerg fB's academy, where he took on a role as an individual coach.

On 1 February 2022 Esbjerg fB confirmed that Lange had been promoted to U19 assistant. Beside that, he would also function as an individual and offensive coach for the academy teams. Esbjerg announces that Lange would join the first team coaching staff of the club, where he would have a special focus on the offensive and some individual training. The former striker would also be assigned as transition coach, where his task would be to make the transition from youth to senior easier for the club's talents.

References

External links
 Jesper Lange on DBU
 
 Official Danish Superliga statistics

1986 births
Living people
Danish men's footballers
Denmark under-21 international footballers
Tarup-Paarup IF players
Odense Boldklub players
Esbjerg fB players
Helsingborgs IF players
Allsvenskan players
Superettan players
Aarhus Gymnastikforening players
Danish Superliga players
Association football forwards
Boldklubben 1913 players
Middelfart Boldklub players
People from Ærø Municipality
Sportspeople from the Region of Southern Denmark